Lots of Girls Gonna Get Hurt is an EP by the Swedish black metal band Shining. It was released through Spinefarm Records on 30 May 2012.

Track listing

Track 1 ("For My Demons") is originally from the album Tonight's Decision by Katatonia.
Track 2 ("Utan dina andetag") is originally a single and from the compilation B-sidor 95–00 by Kent.
Track 3 ("Kung av jidder") is originally from the album Tiggarens tal by Imperiet.
Track 4 ("Carnival of Rust") is originally from the album Carnival of Rust by Poets of the Fall.

Personnel

Shining
Niklas Kvarforth – vocals, guitars, keyboards
Peter Huss – guitars
Christian Larsson – bass guitar
Ludwig Witt – drums

Additional musicians
Elias Holmlid (Dragonland) – string arrangements ("Utan dina andetag")
Peter Bjärgö (Arcana) – vocal coach

Production
Pauline Greefhorst – album cover art
Andy LaRocque – recording, mixing, mastering

References

Shining (Swedish band) albums
2012 EPs
Spinefarm Records EPs